Meri Jeevan Yatra (मेरी जीवन यात्रा), also known as My Journey Through Life is an autobiography of scholar, and polyglot Mahapandit Rahul Sankrityayan. Sankrityayan was fluent in many languages and dialects, including Hindi, Sanskrit, Pali, Bhojpuri, Magahi, Urdu, Persian, Arabic, Tamil, Kannada, Tibetan, Sinhalese, French and Russian. He was an Indologist, a Marxist theoretician, and a creative writer. Meri Jeevan Yatra was first published in 1944. The book describes his life, including his childhood, his life journey, and his professional experiences.

Volumes
The book was published in 6 different Volumes.

See also 
 Hindi literature

References

External links 
 Ram Sharan Sharma, Rahul Sankrityayan and Social Change, Indian History Congress, 1993.
 Ram Sharan Sharma, Rethinking India's Past, (Oxford University Press, 2009).
'Himalayan Buddhism, Past and Present: Mahapandit Rahul Sankrityayan centenary volume'' by D. C. Ahir
 Prabhakar Machwe: "Rahul Sankrityayan" New Delhi 1978: Sahitya Akademi. (A short biography including a list of Sankrityayan's works)

1944 non-fiction books
1950 non-fiction books
Indian autobiographies
Hindi-language literature
20th-century Indian books